Athani (Vidhana Sabha constituency) is one of the 224 constituencies in the Karnataka Legislative Assembly of Karnataka a south state of India. Athani is one of the 8 Vidhan Sabha seats under Chikkodi Lok Sabha constituency. It is in Belgaum district.

Members of Legislative Assembly
Source

Election results

2013 Vidhan Sabha
 Laxman Sangappa Savadi (BJP) : 74,299
 Mahesh Iranagouda Kumathalli (INC) : 50,528

2018 Vidhan Sabha

2019 By-poll

See also
 Athani
 Belagavi district
 List of constituencies of Karnataka Legislative Assembly

References

Assembly constituencies of Karnataka
Belagavi district